Kwon Hyuk-Jin (born December 25, 1984) is a South Korean football player who since 2012 has played for Bangkok United. He formerly played for Ulsan Hyundai, Daejeon Citizen and was most recently with Daejeon Korea Hydro & Nuclear Power FC.

References

1984 births
Living people
South Korean footballers
South Korean expatriate footballers
Ulsan Hyundai FC players
Daejeon Hana Citizen FC players
Gimcheon Sangmu FC players
K League 1 players
Korea National League players
South Korean expatriate sportspeople in Thailand
Expatriate footballers in Thailand
Association football midfielders